C. adisi may refer to:

Cryptocellus adisi , an arachnid species found in Brazil 
Cutervodesmus adisi, a millipede in the family Fuhrmannodesmidae